Moultrie Municipal Airport  is seven miles south of Moultrie in Colquitt County, Georgia, United States. The National Plan of Integrated Airport Systems for 2011–2015 categorized it as a general aviation facility. It has no airline service.

History 
Moultrie Airport was built before World War II; during the war it was used as an auxiliary training field for Spence Army Airfield a few miles to the northeast.  Known as Spence AAF Auxiliary No. 3 It hosted the 455th School Squadron (Special) beginning on August 1, 1941 while still a civil airport.

The airfield was released from military use on December 15, 1945 and returned to civil use. Southern Airways DC-3s began flights to Moultrie in 1949, but probably at Spence initially; by 1955 they were at Sunset Field, as it was then known. Southern's DC-3s were replaced by Martin 404s, then by Metros, then by Republic CV580s that pulled out in 1981. Moultrie dropped out of the OAG in 1988 when Eastern ended code-share prop flights from Atlanta.

Facilities
The airport covers 369 acres (149 ha) at an elevation of 294 feet (90 m). It has two asphalt runways: 4/22 is 5,129 by 100 feet (1,563 x 30 m) and 16/34 is 3,878 by 75 feet (1,182 x 23 m). (Runway 10 closed in the 1970s.)

In the year ending August 11, 2010 the airport had 15,500 general aviation operations, average 42 per day. 29 aircraft were then based at the airport: 93% single-engine and 7% multi-engine.

See also 

 Georgia World War II Army Airfields
 List of airports in Georgia (U.S. state)

References 

 
 Manning, Thomas A. (2005), History of Air Education and Training Command, 1942–2002.  Office of History and Research, Headquarters, AETC, Randolph AFB, Texas

External links 
 MGR - Moultrie Muni (Moultrie) from Georgia DOT
 Aerial image as of January 1993 from USGS The National Map
 

Airports in Georgia (U.S. state)
Buildings and structures in Colquitt County, Georgia
Transportation in Colquitt County, Georgia
Airfields of the United States Army Air Forces in Georgia (U.S. state)
Former Essential Air Service airports